Taquara  is a neighborhood in the West Zone of Rio de Janeiro, Brazil.

The bairro contains the Pau da Fome center of the  Pedra Branca State Park, created in 1974.

References

Neighbourhoods in Rio de Janeiro (city)